Hui cuisine may refer to:
 Chinese Islamic cuisine (Chinese: 回族菜; pinyin: Huízú cài)
 Anhui cuisine (Chinese: 徽菜; pinyin: Huī cài)